Ischnocerus is a genus of fungus weevils in the beetle family Anthribidae. There are about 19 described species in Ischnocerus.

Species
These 19 species belong to the genus Ischnocerus:

 Ischnocerus aeneus Jordan, 1895
 Ischnocerus angulata Martin, 1930
 Ischnocerus angulatus Martin, 1930
 Ischnocerus arizonicus Sleeper, 1954
 Ischnocerus championi Jordan
 Ischnocerus consors Jordan
 Ischnocerus fasciculatus Boheman, 1845
 Ischnocerus griseatus Jordan, 1906
 Ischnocerus impressicollis Jordan, 1895
 Ischnocerus infuscatus Fåhraeus, 1839
 Ischnocerus malleri Jordan, 1937
 Ischnocerus metallicus Jordan, 1906
 Ischnocerus mustelinus Boheman in Shoenherr, 1845
 Ischnocerus mustellinus Boheman, 1845
 Ischnocerus nigellus Schoenherr, 1839
 Ischnocerus spiculosus Chevrolat
 Ischnocerus tuberculatus Imhoff, 1842
 Ischnocerus tuberosus Fairmaire, 1897
 Ischnocerus vittiger Jordan, 1906

References

Further reading

External links

 

Anthribidae
Articles created by Qbugbot